Oriole is a restaurant in West Loop, Chicago. It has earned two Michelin stars, among a small group of Chicago restaurants to do so. It is a New American tasting menu restaurant.

The executive chef is Noah Sandoval.

The Chicago Tribune rated it four stars.
Oriole does not have a dress code.

Awards and honors
The World's 50 Best Restaurants list produced by the UK media company William Reed rated Oriole #91 in the world, several spots ahead of #97 Benu.

See also
List of Michelin starred restaurants in Chicago
Alinea 
Tru
Grace
List of New American restaurants

References

External links
 

Restaurants in Chicago
Michelin Guide starred restaurants in Illinois
New American restaurants in the United States